Shivajee Yadav is a Nepalese politician and a member of  People's Progressive Party. He is the current senior vice president of the party.

In the 2013 Constituent Assembly election he was elected to the constituent assembly from proportional list of the party.

References 

People's Progressive Party (Nepal) politicians
People from Mahottari District

Living people
Year of birth missing (living people)
Members of the 2nd Nepalese Constituent Assembly